The enzyme glycerol-1-phosphatase (EC 3.1.3.21) catalyzes the reaction

glycerol 1-phosphate + H2O  glycerol + phosphate

This enzyme belongs to the family of hydrolases, specifically those acting on phosphoric monoester bonds.  The systematic name is glycerol-1-phosphate phosphohydrolase. Other names in common use include α-glycerophosphatase, α-glycerol phosphatase, glycerol 3-phosphatase, glycerol-3-phosphate phosphatase, and glycerol 3-phosphate phosphohydrolase.  This enzyme participates in glycerolipid metabolism.

Among the organisms that have been shown to express this enzymatic activity are A. thaliana (plant) via the AtSgpp and AtGpp gene products; D. salina (alga); S. cerevisiae (fungus) via the GPP1/RHR2/YIL053W and GPP2/HOR2/YER062C gene products; C. albicans (fungus) via the GPP1 gene product; M. tuberculosis (bacteria) via the rv1692 gene product; and C57BL/6N mice and Wistar rats (mammals) via the PGP gene product.

References

EC 3.1.3
Enzymes of unknown structure